Kerstin Gier (born 8 October 1966) is a German author of novels for adults and young adults. Her popular young adult novel Rubinrot (Ruby Red) and its two sequels - a series about time travel - as well as her Silber trilogy were translated into English by Anthea Bell.<ref>{{Cite web|title="The Time Travel Gene", The New York Times,05/15/2011|url=https://www.nytimes.com/2011/05/15/books/review/young-adult-books-ruby-red-by-kerstin-gier.html}}</ref>

Bibliography
Young adult books
Gem Trilogy
 Rubinrot, 2009 (Published in the United States as Ruby Red, Henry Holt and Co., 2011)
 Saphirblau, 2010 (Published in the United States as Sapphire Blue, Henry Holt and Co., 2012)
 Smaragdgrün, 2012 (Published in the United States as Emerald Green, Henry Holt and Co., 2013)
 Liebe geht durch alle Zeiten, 2012 (Published in the United States as The Ruby Red Trilogy Boxed Set, Square Fish, 2014)

Silver: The Book Of Dreams Trilogy
Silber. Das erste Buch der Träume, 2013 (Published in the United States as Dream A Little Dream, Henry Holt and Co., 2015)
Silber. Das zweite Buch der Träume, 2014 (Published in the United States as Dream On, Henry Holt and Co., 2016)
Silber. Das dritte Buch der Träume, 2015 (Published in the United States as Just Dreaming, Henry Holt and Co., 2017)

Other
 Jungs sind wie Kaugummi, 2009
 Das Wolkenschloss, 2017 (Published in the United States as A Castle in the Clouds'', Henry Holt and Co., 2020)
 Was man bei Licht nicht sehen kann (2021)

Adult books
 Männer und andere Katastrophen, 1996
Die Laufmasche, 1997
 Die Braut sagt leider nein, 1998
 Fisherman's Friend in meiner Koje, 1998
 Die Mütter-Mafia, 2005
 Die Patin, 2006
 Ach, wär ich nur zu Hause geblieben, 2007
 Ehebrecher und andere Unschuldslämmer, 2007
 Für jede Lösung ein Problem, 2007
 Lügen, die von Herzen kommen, 2007
 Ein unmoralisches Sonderangebot, 2008
 Gegensätze ziehen sich aus, 2009
 In Wahrheit wird viel mehr gelogen, 2009
 Auf der anderen Seite ist das Gras viel grüner, 2011
 Die Mütter-Mafia und Friends, 2011

References

External links

 
 Publisher's Author Page*

Living people
German children's writers
German women children's writers
21st-century German women writers
1966 births